Percy Butler III (born May 29, 2000) is an American football free safety for the Washington Commanders of the National Football League (NFL). He played college football at Louisiana and was drafted by the Commanders in the fourth round of the 2022 NFL Draft.

High school and college
Butler was born on May 29, 2000, in Plaquemine, Louisiana, later attending Plaquemine High School. A 2-star recruit, he committed to play college football for the Louisiana Ragin' Cajuns at the University of Louisiana at Lafayette. He played in six games as a freshman before suffering an injury. He played in all 14 of Louisiana's games with 12 starts in his sophomore season and had 54 tackles with two passes broken up and three forced fumbles.

As a junior, Butler made 44 tackles with two forced fumbles, two fumble recoveries, six passes broken up, and two interceptions. He was given second-team All-Sun Belt honors as a senior after recording 61 tackles, three fumble recoveries, and an interception. He also participated in the 2022 NFL Combine.

Professional career
Butler was selected by the Washington Commanders in the fourth round (113th overall) of the 2022 NFL Draft. He signed his four-year rookie contract on June 21, 2022.

References

External links
 
 Washington Commanders bio
 Louisiana Ragin' Cajuns bio

2000 births
Living people
Louisiana Ragin' Cajuns football players
People from Plaquemine, Louisiana
Players of American football from Louisiana
American football safeties
Washington Commanders players